Pedro de Jesus Quirós Jiménez (August 1, 1819, San José, Costa Rica – May 1, 1883, San José) was a Costa Rican military man, landowner, and politician.  He served twice as Vice President of Costa Rica, from 1877 to 1882, and from 1881 to 1882.  He along with his brother Pablo Quirós Jiménez served as generals in the Costa Rican army.

References

1819 births
1883 deaths
People from San José, Costa Rica
Vice presidents of Costa Rica